Dario Fegatelli (born 28 August 1969) is a former Italian male long-distance runner who competed at one edition of the IAAF World Cross Country Championships at senior level (1993) and one of the IAAF World Half Marathon Championships (1996).

References

External links
 Dario Fegatelli profile at Association of Road Racing Statisticians

1969 births
Living people
Italian male long-distance runners
Italian male cross country runners